Nawab Khan Bahadur Khwaja Yusuf Jan (21 January 1850 – 8 November 1923), was a Kashmiri-Bengali politician and member of Dhaka Nawab family.

Early life

Jan was born on 21 January 1850 to a Kashmiri Muslim family in Dhaka, Bengal Presidency, British India. He studied Arabic, Urdu, Persian, and English from home tutors. He organized the Mohammedan Association in 1883.

Career
From 1884 to 1923 Jan served as a member of Dhaka Municipality. From 1897 to 1901 he was the chairman of Dhaka Municipality. He served as the vice chairman of Dhaka District Board from 1897 to 1905. In 1903 he was awarded Certificate of Honor, in 1904 Khan Bahadur and in 1910 Nawab by the British Government. In 1905, he attended a meeting in Northbrook Hall led by Nawab Salimullah in University of Dhaka, where the Mohammedan Association was transformed into the Mohammedan Provincial Union.

Jan was made the secretary of the union. From 1901 to 1905 he was the vice chairman of Dhaka Municipality and from 1905 to 1916 he served as the chairman of Dhaka Municipality. On 16 October 1910, he presided over the meeting of the Muslim League in Bengal. He supported the partition of Bengal. In 1913, a market in Naya Bazar was named after him. He was the chairman of the district board from 1921 to 1923. He served in the East Bengal Legislative assembly from 1907. He served as the Honorary magistrate of Dhaka for 28 years. He was the secretary of Lady Duffrein Hospital, Dhaka.

Personal life and death
Jan was married to Nurjahan Khanam and they had a son, Khwaja Muhammad Afzal.

Jan died on 8 November 1923 in Dhaka.

References

1850 births
1923 deaths
People from Dhaka
Members of the Dhaka Nawab family